Willi Piecyk (born 11 August 1948 in Munich; died 1 August 2008 in Großhansdorf) was a German politician and
Member of the European Parliament with the Social Democratic Party of Germany, part of the Socialist Group and sat on the European Parliament's Committee on Fisheries and its Committee on Transport and Tourism.

He was a substitute for the Committee on Budgets and a member of the
Delegation to the EU-Former Yugoslav Republic of Macedonia Joint Parliamentary Committee.

From 1966 to 1968, he served as a police officer.

Education 
 Secondary school-leaving certificate (1972) Studied economics and political science
 1979: Politics degree
 Adult education tutor
 1980-1982: Chairman of the Young Socialists
 1991-1999: Chairman of the Schleswig-Holstein SPD
 1992-2008: Member of the European Parliament

See also 
 2004 European Parliament election in Germany

External links 
 
 

1948 births
2008 deaths
MEPs for Germany 2004–2009
Social Democratic Party of Germany MEPs
Politicians from Munich